Tiberius Claudius Nero was a Roman man who lived in the 3rd century BC. He was one of the four sons of Appius Claudius Caecus and the first man to carry the cognomen Nero. The whole branch of the Claudii Nerones descend from him, including the Julio-Claudian emperors Tiberius, Caligula, Claudius and Nero.

Biography

Early life
Nero had three brothers, Appius Claudius Russus, Publius Claudius Pulcher and Gaius Claudius Centho, as well as at least one sister named Claudia. It is likely based on their ages that they did not share the same mother. Nero was the only one of Caecus's sons not to serve as consul.

The Roman historian Suetonius claimed that in the Sabine language, the name Nero meant "strong and valiant" or "strong and energetic".

Family
Nero had two sons; Tiberius Claudius Nero and Publius Claudius Nero. His elder son Tiberius became the father of Gaius Claudius Nero, a general; and his younger son Publius had two sons, one named Tiberius Claudius Nero who was consul in 202 BC and Appius Claudius Nero who was praetor in 195.

Notes

References

Claudii Nerones
3rd-century BC Romans